Sepia mascarensis is a species of cuttlefish native to the western Indian Ocean, specifically Saya-de-Malha Bank, Mascarene Ridge, and Cargados-Carajos Shoals. It lives at depths of between 87 and 325 m.

Sepia mascarensis grows to a mantle length of 67 to 124 mm.

The type specimen was collected in the Saya-de-Malha Bank, Indian Ocean. It is deposited at the Zoological Museum in Moscow.

References

External links

Cuttlefish
Molluscs described in 1991